Chantal Westerman was the Entertainment Editor and Hollywood Correspondent of ABC's Good Morning America (GMA) from 1986 through 2000.

Since April 2011, Westerman has been hosting ConciergeQ Conversations with Chantal Westerman. ConciergeQ Conversations with Chantal Westerman are in-depth interviews with guests who are also featured on The Concierge Questionnaire, an online travel magazine. Her first featured guests were Fort Worth Opera and The Thrilling Adventure Hour.

Guests-ConciergeQ Conversations with Chantal Westerman
Charles Brandt
David Berkeley
Fairmont Hotels and Resorts
Fort Worth Opera
Heather Rae
Howard T. Owens
Jack Sullivan (CEO Broadway Video)
Janet Hopkins
Jim McGorman
Jonathan Goldman
Kat Edmonson
Lelia Broussard
Melba Moore
Michael Franks (musician)
Rider Strong
The Thrilling Adventure Hour

References 
"Integral Naked - Who is Chantal Westerman?" www.integralnaked.org 2004-09-20 retrieved 2011-03-13
"Internet Movie Database-Chantal Westerman" www.IMDb.com retrieved 2011-03-13
"The Concierge Questionnaire" www.conciergeq.com 2011-03-18 retrieved 2011-03-22
"ConciergeQ Conversations with Chantal Westerman" www.conciergeq.com retrieved 2012-05-11
"Social Media, Online Travel’s Shangri-La" www.brandchannel.com 2011-08-22 retrieved 2011-09-04

External links 
The Concierge Questionnaire
Everyday Opera

Year of birth missing (living people)
Living people
ABC News personalities